Terry Sanderson is the name of:

Terry Sanderson (lacrosse) (1952–2014), Canadian lacrosse coach and general manager
Terry Sanderson (writer) (born 1946), British secularist and gay rights activist